Leandro Antonio da Silva known as Tigrão (born July 6, 1982 in Rio de Janeiro) is a Brazilian former professional footballer who played as a midfielder. He spent one season in the Bundesliga with 1. FC Nürnberg.

External links
CBF 

Living people
1982 births
Association football defenders
Brazilian footballers
América Futebol Clube (MG) players
1. FC Nürnberg players
Odds BK players
Americano Futebol Clube players
Bundesliga players
Eliteserien players
Brazilian expatriate footballers
Brazilian expatriate sportspeople in Germany
Expatriate footballers in Germany
Brazilian expatriate sportspeople in Norway
Expatriate footballers in Norway
Footballers from Rio de Janeiro (city)